The Lake Texcoco Ecological Park, officially called Proyecto Ecológico Lago de Texcoco (PELT), is a project of the government of Mexico which consists of an urban park in the State of Mexico. It is part of the larger metropolitan area in the Valley of Mexico, around Mexico City. At an unspecified date in 2023, the government expects to open the park to the public.

The park has been internationally praised as both a major ecological restoration project, and having great potential for climate adaptation for Mexico City.

History 
Before the arrival of the Spanish in 1519, the indigenous groups of the area were thriving. Specifically in the Valley of Mexico, the Teotihuacan, Toltecs, and Aztecs had risen to power at different points throughout history. In 1519, however, only the Aztecs were still active civilizations. The Aztec empire was conquered by the Spanish in 1521, and the city of Tenochtitlan was rebuilt and named Mexico City.

The park occupies land in Mexico City which had previously been part of the Lake of Texcoco.  In the Valley of Mexico, the indigenous people altered the landscape around them through the use of technology like dikes to redirect water flow from the lakes that surrounded them. They utilized the flooding for crops and to ensure proper maintenance of the land. When the Spanish colonized the area, they began a massive project to drain the lakes instead of utilizing the benefits of the floods. This project, called the Desagüe (drain), began in 1607, when they officially broke ground. The Spanish felt that the drainage of the lake was necessary because of the frequent floods that threatened to destroy buildings and the infrastructure that the Spanish had established. Constant maintenance of the project was necessary and in as early as 1629, the system failed and the city flooded. Because of this failure, engineers turned to a trench model instead of tunnels, and the construction lasted for more than 150 years.  This project resulted in massive destruction of the land and endangered species that live in the area, such as the axolotl. 

There are ongoing issues with obtaining enough drinking water for people who live in Mexico City. This is partially due to the fact that the lakes were drained and the location of the city makes it difficult to funnel in new sources of water. Some of the current issues that the city is facing with regards to water is the management of sewage and the inequality that exists in water distribution. People that live in wealthier areas get access to water first while the rest of Mexico City has to wait to get their water later. 
 
The space had been designated for the construction of the new international airport for Mexico City. There were protests about the airport project, specifically a movement was created called #YoPrefieroElLago (I prefer the lake). This movement was built by local people who wanted to prevent the destruction of the land and ensure that their land was not stripped from them. Ultimately, this movement along with other pressures resulted in the project being canceled in January 2019. Instead of building an airport in Texcoco, the Felipe Ángeles International Airport was built in Santa Lucía.

Announcement and financing 
In August 2020, the government announced the project. On August 27, the Secretariat of Finance and Public Credit (SHCP) announced that the estimated cost was $17.713 billion pesos to be spent over 8 years. In December 2020 the National Commission of Water (Comisión Nacional del Agua or CONAGUA), said that it was investing 13 billion pesos into the project.

Description 
The park will include multiple natural spaces from the metropolitan area including the Bosque de Chapultepec. The architect Iñaki Echeverría is in charge of the design of the parks.

The park will be divided into four parts: Lago Nabor Carrillo, Cruickshank, Xochiaca-Churubusco and Caracol.

Planned land use 

The main objective of this project is to reclaim the site to a green infrastructure in the valley of Mexico City. Rather than returning the area of an intact ecosystem from before the Spanish colonization, the key is to create a complete balance between infrastructure and nature. 

The proposed area of the park will be 35,000 acres that will include reforested areas for hiking and biking, sports fields for soccer and restored wetlands and lakes, and areas for families and picnics. In addition, renewable energy facilities, community gardens, water treatment facilities and a research center for the study of wetlands. 

The project aims at reconciling the city with its geography, incorporating the hydrological cycles, eliminating the threat of floods for the metropolitan area of Mexico City, and also contributing to re-establish the native biodiversity. The finished plan will preserve 678 species of native flora and fauna to the Lake Texcoco area including, 5 species of amphibians, 14 species of reptiles, 276 species of birds, and 29 species of mammals. Specifically, the burrowing owl, the rough-necked Alicante lizard, the folded tree frog and the mexclapique of the basin of Mexico. All is meant to bring back the recovered ecosystem of Mexico City and Lake Texcoco Valley. The day of the park’s opening is unknown as the date has been continuously pushed back, with no set date in the future. Information is difficult to find.

Iñaki Echeverria 
Iñaki Echeverria is the architect in charge of PELT. He graduated from The National Autonomous University of Mexico and holds a masters degree from Columbia University’s Graduate School of Architecture: Planning and Preservation (GSAPP). His architectural approach consists of a multidisciplinary focus which offers unique and specific solutions to complex issues. This includes projection of recuperation, environmental mediation and territorial strategies to design architecture and landscape; additionally, he designs his projections as an intersection between concepts of architectural design and installations of art.

See also 
 Mexico City Texcoco Airport

References 

Parks in Mexico City